Andrew Muir (born 9 July 1976) is a Northern Irish politician who is an Alliance Party Member of the Legislative Assembly (MLA) for North Down. He was appointed as an MLA following incumbent Alliance MLA Stephen Farry's election as MP for North Down in the 2019 UK general election, and elected in the constituency in the 2022 Northern Ireland Assembly election.

Political career

Council (2010-2019) 
Muir was co-opted onto North Down Borough Council in 2010, and was elected for the Hollywood DEA at the 2011 local elections. He was elected on the first count with 22.73% of FPVs, but he did not top the poll as newly elected MLA Gordon Dunne out-polled him by 90 votes.

Muir became the first openly gay mayor in Northern Ireland when he became North Down Borough Council mayor from 2013 to 2014.

Muir was re-elected at the 2014 local election for the Holywood and Clandeboye DEA, following the local government reform that merged Ards and North Down borough councils. He ran as one of two Alliance candidates, with now- MLA for Belfast South Kate Nicholl being his running mate. He was elected behind Stephen Dunne, the son of Gordon Dunne, and now MLA for North Down.

Muir ran alongside Stephen Farry as an Alliance candidate at the 2016 Assembly election in North Down, and was runner up behind his party colleague.

Muir was subsequently re-elected at the 2019 local elections, topping the poll with 1,397 votes (20.43%). His running mate Gillian Greer was also elected on the first count and gained a seat at the expense of the DUP.

Member of the Legislative Assembly (2019-) 
Muir was selected by Alliance to replace Stephen Farry, the newly elected MP for North Down, and was co-opted into the Assembly. In doing so, he became the second openly gay member of the Assembly, after Alliance MLA John Blair (South Antrim).

He is currently Party Chief Whip and Alliance's Infrastructure and Finance Spokesperson.

He was selected to run as one of Alliance's two candidates in North Down for the 2022 Northern Ireland Assembly election and both he and his running mate, Connie Egan, were elected. He polled the second most FPVs (6,838) and 16.38% of the vote as Alliance increased their vote by 10.3% in the constituency.

Personal life 
Muir is openly gay.

References

External links 
 Official website/
 Twitter

Living people
Alliance Party of Northern Ireland MLAs
LGBT politicians from Northern Ireland
People from County Down
1976 births
Gay politicians
21st-century LGBT people
Northern Ireland MLAs 2017–2022
Northern Ireland MLAs 2022–2027
21st-century politicians from Northern Ireland